Phidyle is a genus of South American anyphaenid sac spiders containing the single species, Phidyle punctipes. It was  first described by Eugène Simon in 1880, and has only been found in Chile.

References

Anyphaenidae
Monotypic Araneomorphae genera
Spiders of South America
Taxa named by Eugène Simon
Endemic fauna of Chile